In linguistics, Aeolic Greek, also known as Aeolian, Lesbian or Lesbic dialect, is the set of dialects of Ancient Greek spoken mainly in Boeotia; in Thessaly; in the Aegean island of Lesbos; and in the Greek colonies of Aeolis in Anatolia and adjoining islands.

The Aeolic dialect shows many archaisms in comparison to the other Ancient Greek dialects (Arcadocypriot, Attic, Ionic, and Doric varieties), as well as many innovations.

Aeolic Greek is widely known as the language of Sappho and of Alcaeus of Mytilene. Aeolic poetry, which is exemplified in the works of Sappho, mostly uses four classical meters known as the Aeolics: Glyconic (the most basic form of Aeolic line), hendecasyllabic verse, Sapphic stanza, and Alcaic stanza (the latter two are respectively named for Sappho and Alcaeus).

In Plato's Protagoras, Prodicus labelled the Aeolic dialect of Pittacus of Mytilene as "barbarian" (barbaros), because of its difference from the Attic literary style: "He didn't know to distinguish the words correctly, being from Lesbos, and having been raised with a barbarian dialect".

Phonology

Consonants

Labiovelars
Proto-Indo-European and Proto-Greek * changed to Aeolic p everywhere. By contrast, PIE * changed to Attic/Ionic, Arcadocypriot, and Doric t before e and i.
 PIE * → Lesbian písures, Boeotian péttares ~ Attic téttares, Ionic tésseres, Doric tétores "four"
Similarly PIE/PGk * always became b and PIE * > PGk * always became ph (whereas in other dialects they became alternating b/d and ph/th before back/front vowels).

Labiovelars were treated the same way in the P-Celtic languages and the Sabellic languages.

Sonorant clusters

A Proto-Greek consonant cluster with h (from Indo-European ) and a sonorant (r, l, n, m, w, y) changed to a double sonorant (rr, ll, nn, mm, ww, yy) in Lesbian and Thessalian (sub-dialects of Aeolic) by assimilation. In Attic/Ionic, Doric, and Boeotian Aeolic, the h assimilated to the vowel before the consonant cluster, causing the vowel to lengthen by compensatory lengthening.
 PIE VsR or VRs → Attic/Ionic-Doric-Boeotian VVR.
 PIE VsR or VRs → Lesbian-Thessalian VRR.
 PIE * → Proto-Greek *ehmi → Lesbian-Thessalian emmi ~ Attic/Ionic ēmi (= ) "I am"

Loss of h
Lesbian Aeolic lost initial h- (psilosis "stripping") from Proto-Indo-European s- or y-. By contrast, Ionic sometimes retains it, and Attic always retains it.
 PIE * → Proto-Greek *hāwélios → Lesbian āélios, Ionic ēélios ~ Attic hēlios "sun"

Retention of w
In Thessalian and Boeotian (sub-dialects of Aeolic) and Doric, the Proto-Indo-European and Proto-Greek semi-vowel w (digamma) was retained at the beginning of a word.
 PIE  → Boeotian, Doric wépos ~ Attic-Ionic épos "word", "epic" (compare Latin vōx "voice")

Vowels

Long a
In Aeolic and Doric, Proto-Greek long ā remains. By contrast, in Attic, long ā changes to long ē in most cases; in Ionic, it changes everywhere.
 PIE  → Aeolic, Doric mātēr ~ Attic/Ionic mētēr "mother"

Compensatory lengthening
Compensatory lengthening of a,e,o in Lesbian gives ai,ei,oi (in Attic, it would be ā,ei,ou) for example in the accusative plural of a and o stem nouns, or in many 3 Pl verb conjugations.

Boeotian
In Boeotian, the vowel-system was, in many cases, changed in a way reminiscent of the modern Greek pronunciation.
 Attic/Ionic   ~ Boeotian   ~ Modern Greek  
 Attic/Ionic   ~ Boeotian   ~ Modern Greek  
 Attic/Ionic   ~ Boeotian   ~ Mediaeval Greek and Old Athenaean   ~ Modern Greek

Accent
In Lesbian Aeolic, the accent of all words is recessive (barytonesis), as is typical only in the verbs of other dialects.
 Attic/Ionic potamós ~ Lesbian pótamos "river"

Morphology
Contracted or vowel-stem verbs that are thematic in Attic/Ionic are often athematic (-mi) in Aeolic.
 Ionic philéō, Attic philô ~ Aeolic phílēmi "I love"

Aeolic athematic infinitive active ends in -men or (Lesbian) -menai. ~ Attic/Ionic has -enai.
 Lesbian émmen, émmenai; Thessalian, Boeotian eîmen ~ Attic/Ionic eînai (spurious diphthong) "to be"
In the Lesbian dialect this ending also extends to the thematic conjugation, where Attic/Ionic has -ein. All three of these Aeolic endings occur in Homer.
 Homeric agémen

Proto-Greek -ans and -ons → -ais and -ois (first- and second declension accusative plural) ~ Attic/Ionic -ās and -ōs (-ους).

Dative plural -aisi and -oisi ~ Attic/Ionic -ais and -ois.

The participle has -ois and -ais for Attic -ōs (-ους), -ās.

Glossary

Below it is a list of several words in the Aeolian dialect, written in the Greek alphabet and next to a transcription in the Latin alphabet. Each word is followed by its meaning and compared to similar words in other ancient Greek dialects.

Aeolian

  "sun" (also Doric; Attic hēlios; Cretan abelios; Laconian bela; Pamphylian babelios) (PIE *sawel-)
 ágōnos "struggle" (Attic  agōn; Elean dat. pl. agōnois for agōsi)
  gifts sent by kin to Lesbian brides (Sappho fr.) (compare Homeric hedna, eedna)
 Aiolíōnes "Aeolians" (Attic  Aioleîs) ( "speak Aeolic, compose in the Aeolian mode, trick out with false words" Sophocles Fr.912 ) (aioleō vary, adorn, diversify (aiolos quick-moving, glittering, shifty)
 aklades (unpruned vineyards) (Attic akladeutoi ampeloi)
 akontion (part of troops) (Attic spear) (Macedonian rhachis, spine or backbone, anything ridged like the backbone)
 -τος amenēs -tos (Attic ὑμήν humēn) thin skin, membrane.
 amōnes (Attic ἀνεμώνες anemones
 aoros (Attic ἄϋπνος ahypnos, without sleep) Μηθυμναῖοι
 arpys (Attic ἔρως Eros, Love) attested in Crinagoras, ἁρπάζειν harpazein to snatch. Homeric harpaleos attractive,devouring
 asphe to them (Attic sphe, sphi)
  bakchoa (Attic βόθρος bothros sacred dungeon, pit)
 balla threshold (Attic  bēlos) (Doric balos)
 belphin dolphin (Attic delphis) and  Belphoi  Delphi
 bama Doric also (Attic βῆμα bema walking, step)
 blēr incitement (Attic delear) 
 bradanizō brandish, shake off. (Cf.Elean bratana Common rhatane)
  bradinos slender, soft (Attic rhadinos) Sapph.90,104.
  braidion (Attic ῥᾴδιον rhaidion easy)
 brakein to understand (dysbrakanon imprehensible)
   brakos long robe, Sapph.70  Homeric ῥάκος ϝράκος rhakos wrakos
 briza root (Attic rhiza)
 brodon (Attic ῥόδον rhodon, rose) and vagina metaphorically in Erotic Glossary.
 brodopachus with pink, rosy forearms (Attic rhodopechys) ( brodopachun Sappho) and brododaktulos  with rosy fingers
  brocheos or βρουκέων broukeon (Attic βραχύ brachy short)  (Sapph.fr. 2,7)
 drasein  (Attic θύειν to sacrifice)
 dnophos darkness Ionic also (Attic  zophos) (akin to knephas)
 eide (Attic  ὕλη, forest) (εἴδη Ionian also)
  Ennesiades  Lesbian Nymphs
 epialtēs and epialēs nightmare (Attic ephialtēs) (wiki Ephialtes)
 zadelon with holes in it, open (Attic diadelon obvious) (Alcaeus 30 D 148P)
 imbēris eel (Attic  enchelys)  Μηθυμναῖοι
 iron holy (Attic  hierón) (Doric hiarón) (Ionic hirón)
 Issa old name of Lesbos Island Cf. Antissa
  issasthai (Attic  klerousthai to take sth by lot)
 kankulē (Attic  kēkis wet,vapour, mordant dyeing)
  kammarpsis dry Measure  (Attic  hemimedimnon, one half of a medimnos)
 karabides  (Attic  graes) Μηθυμναῖοι
 kaualeon Hsch (Attic  aithos fire, burning heat) (Cf.kaiō burn)
  klaides Doric also (Attic kleides  bars, bolts, keys)
 Mesostrophonia Lesbian festival
  messui (Attic ἐν μέσῳ in the middle)
 molsos  (Attic , fat)
 xennos foreigner, guest-friend, strange (Attic xenos) (Ionic xeinos)
 ximba  (Attic ῥοιά rhoia pomegranate-tree) (Boeotian sida)
 othmata (Attic ommata eyes)
 ón  óna (Attic  aná) upon, through, again (Arcadocypriot also)
  passyrion    (Attic passydia  totally,all together,with the whole army)
 pedameivō (Attic metameivo exchange) (πεδέχω pedecho μετέχω metecho), pedoikos metoikos peda for meta
 pempe five (Attic  pente, Pamphylian  pede ) (   pempassein to count per five) (Attic pempe imp. of pempō send)
 Perrhamos  Priamus (Alcaeus 74D,111P (it means also king)
 pésdos pedestrian,infantry) (Attic  pezós)
 pesson plain (Attic  pedion)
 pessyres four (Lesbian  pisyres) (Boeotian  pettares) (Attic  tessares) (Doric tetores)
  saōmi save (Attic  sōizō ) (Homeric  saoō)
 siglai ear-rings (Attic enōtia, Laconian exōbadia)
 skiphos Attic xiphos sword (skiptō, given as etym. of skiphos and xiphos, Sch.Il.1.220; cf. skipei: nussei, it pricks,pierces)
 spóla(Attic  stolē) equipment, garment (spaleis, the sent one, for staleis)
 strótos (Attic stratós) army
 syrx (Attic σάρξ flesh) (dative plural σύρκεσιν syrkesi  Attic σαρξίν sarxin)
  tenekounti (Attic enoikounti dative singular of   enoikōn inhabiting)
 tragais  you break, grow rough and hoarse and smell like a goat
 tude  tudai and tuide here) (Ionic tēde)
 usdos (Attic ozos twig, branch)
 phauophoros priestess (Attic  hiereia) (light-keeper) (Aeolic phauō for Homeric phaō shine) (Homeric phaos light, Attic phōs and phōtophoros)
 phēria (Attic  thēria beasts)
 Psapphō, (Attic  Sapphō)

Boeotian
 aas   aestēton tomorrow (Attic  aurion) (Cf.Attic ēōs dawn)
 amillakas wine Theban (Attic oinos)
 anōdorkas a fish   
 baidumēn (Attic  arotrian  to plough)
 bastrax or bastax   (Attic τράχηλος trachēlos neck)  pl. bastraches
 bleerei (Attic οἰκτείρει he feels pity) Cf. eleairei
 gadou ( wadou) (Attic  hēdú) (Corinna.17)
 Deus instead of Zeus. Attested also in Laconian and Rhodian.
 empyria divination (Attic manteia) (Hsch.  public oath, Koine ordeal by fire)
 zekeltides  gourds Amerias zakeltides (Phrygian zelkia vegetables)
 idephin  sweet-voiced. Hsch.:  (Attic hēduphōnon) ( Aeolic wad-, ad- )
  istake scythe (Attic  drepanon)
  iugodromein (Attic , ekboēthein, and boēdromein, run to help)(Iungios  Thessalian month)
 iō and hiōn (Attic   egō, I) (hiōnga iōga for egōge)
 Karaios Boeotian epithet for Zeus meaning tall,head. Boeotian eponym Karaidas
 karoux (Attic kēryx herald)
 kriddemen (Attic  gelan to laugh) (Strattis fr. 47) Cf. (Cf.Attic krizō creak,screech)
 korilla little girl (Koine korasion from Attic korasis girl) (Aetolian korudion)
 mēlatas  (Attic  poimen shepherd) (homeric  mēlon sheep) (Attic mēlon apple, Aeolic-Doric malon)
 mnarion (Attic  kallyntron  broom, brush)
 opisthotila   (Attic  sēpia cuttlefish)  (Strattis. fr. 47,3) (squirts its liquor from behind)
 opittomai (homeric opizomai I care,respect) (Laconian opiddomai)
 ophrygnai (Attic  ophryazei  he winks raising the eyebrow, is haughty)
  seia  I persecuted (Attic  edioxa) (Cf.Homeric seuō move quickly, chase)
 syoboiōtoi  Hog-Boeotians (Cratinus.310)
 tripeza  (Attic trapeza,table)(from tetrapeza four-footed) (tripeza three-footed) (in Aeolic it would-be tripesda)
 psōsmata  Boeotian word acc. Aristonymus

Thessalian

 abremēs (Attic  ablepēs   unworthy seeing, despicable (Cypriotic also) (Hes. text 
 agora  (Attic  limen port, harbour) (Hes. text 
 alphinia white poplar (PIE *albho- 'white') (Attic leukē, PIE *leuk- 'bright, light') (Macedonian aliza)
 Aploun Apollo (Attic  Apollōn) (Doric, Pamphylian  Apelon)
 aspaleia safeness (Attic asphaleia)
 astralos  (Attic ψάρ -ος psar Starling)
 bebukousthai  to be swollen (Homeric  buktaon blowing)
  bousia (Attic γογγυλίδι gongylidi turnip)
 dámossos public (Attic dēmósios) opp.  iddioûstikos privative (Attic idiōtikós)
 daratos Thessalian bread (Macedonian dramis) (Athamanian dramix) (PIE *der- cut,split)
  despoina  woman (Attic gunē, Doric guna) (fem. of despotes)
 enormos  (agora, assembly, market and chōra) (Attic enormeō get in a harbour, hormos bay, anchorage
  ereas children (Hsch.Attic  tekna) (Homeric ernos young sprout, scion) (Neo-Phrygian eiroi children)
 theanoustai (Attic  xysters)
 itheiē  (Attic  hamaxitos  chariot-road)   (Homeric  Ψ 580) (Attic ithys, eytheia straight line)
 impsas  past participle of impto (Attic ζεύξας zeuxas zeugnymi  join together) (Ἴμψιος Impsios Ποσειδῶν ὁ ζύγιος Poseidon Zygius on horses)
 kalaphos  (Attic ἀσκάλαφος, Ascalaphus a bird  (Magnesian)
 kapanē chariot (Attic  apēnē)  also, a helmet(kapanikos plenteous
 kis who, anyone (Attic tis) (Laconian tir) (Arcadocypriot sis)
 karpaia  Thessalo-Macedonian mimic military  dance (see also Carpaea) Homeric karpalimos swift (for foot) eager,ravenous.
  kyrrhos or kyrros sir, master (Attic kyrios)
 Maketoun 'Macedonian man' (Attic  Makedōn) (Thessalian -oun suffix for Attic  ōn in both nominative and genitive of participles,pronouns and nouns.
 mattuē a meat-dessert of Macedonian or Thessalian origin (Athenaeus) (Macedonian mattuēs a kind of bird)
 nealeis   new-comers, newly caught ones (Cf. nealeis, neēludes)
 nebeuō pray (Macedonian neuō) (Attic euchomai, neuō wink)
 onala,  onalouma (Attic analōma expense cost) ( on- in the place of Attic prefix ana-, ongrapsantas SEG 27:202
 tageuō to be tagos archon in Thessaly

See also
Aeolus
Sappho
Alcaeus of Mytilene
Ancient Macedonian language
Hesychius of Alexandria

References

Further reading

Bakker, Egbert J., ed. 2010. A companion to the Ancient Greek language. Oxford: Wiley-Blackwell.
Bowie, Angus M. 1981. The poetic dialect of Sappho and Alcaeus. New York: Arno. 
Christidis, Anastasios-Phoivos, ed. 2007. A history of Ancient Greek: From the beginnings to Late Antiquity. Cambridge, UK: Cambridge University Press.
Colvin, Stephen C. 2007. A historical Greek reader: Mycenaean to the koiné. Oxford: Oxford University Press.
Horrocks, Geoffrey. 2010. Greek: A history of the language and its speakers. 2nd ed. Oxford: Wiley-Blackwell.
Page, Denis L. 1953. Corinna. London: Society for the Promotion of Hellenic Studies.
Palmer, Leonard R. 1980. The Greek language. London: Faber & Faber.
West, Martin L. 1990. "Dating Corinna." Classical Quarterly 40 (2): 553–57.

Varieties of Ancient Greek
Languages of ancient Thessaly
Culture of ancient Thessaly
Greek
Languages attested from the 8th century BC
Languages extinct in the 3rd century BC